Fame and Fortune Weekly: Stories of Boys Who Make Money (1905–1929) was an American periodical for children published by Frank Tousey in New York which had 1197 weekly issues.

History and profile
The magazine was started in 1905 with the name Fame and Fortune Weekly. The first issue appeared on October 6, 1905. The magazine was redesigned as a pulp magazine and renamed as Fame and Fortune Magazine in October 1928. The frequency of the magazine was also switched to biweekly in 1928. Then it was renamed as Fortune Story Magazine in July 1929 and ended publication in December of that year.

References

External links
 University of South Florida Libraries: Fame and Fortune Weekly
 Fame and Fortune Weekly issues at Gutenberg
 Fame and Fortune Weekly at LibriVox (public domain audiobooks)

Biweekly magazines published in the United States
Children's magazines published in the United States
Weekly magazines published in the United States
Capitalism
Defunct magazines published in the United States
Magazines published in New York (state)
Magazines established in 1905
Magazines disestablished in 1929
Pulp magazines
1905 establishments in New York (state)